Clionaidae is a family of demosponges which are found worldwide. This family is known for parasitically boring holes in calcareous material such as mollusc shells and corals, using both chemical and mechanical processes.

Genera
Genera within this family include:
 Cervicornia Rützler & Hooper, 2000
 Cliona Grant, 1826
 Clionaopsis Rützler, 2002
 Cliothosa Topsent, 1905
 Dotona Carter, 1880
 Pione Gray, 1867
 Scolopes Sollas, 1888
 Spheciospongia Marshall, 1892
 Spiroxya Topsent, 1896
 Volzia Rosell & Uriz, 1997

References

Hadromerida